The Saudi–Egypt Causeway is a proposal to link Egypt and Saudi Arabia with a causeway and bridge.

Profile
The Egyptian president suggested to name the proposed structure "King Salman bin Abdulaziz Bridge". The entire project is expected to cost about 4 billion US dollars and will be financed by Saudi Arabia. The causeway would link Tabuk to the Red Sea resort of Sharm el-Sheikh on the Sinai Peninsula and would pass through Tiran Island at the entrance of the Gulf of Aqaba. Funding for the causeway was announced from the Saudi Binladin Group, which will work the Egyptian government-run firm Arab Contractors.

The proposed construction projects aim to create closer links between the two nations and create jobs on both sides. This is part of a greater plan by the Egyptian government that intends to populate the Sinai peninsula. It will also provide an alternative pilgrimage route, and is expected to serve a million passengers and pilgrims annually.

Concerns have been raised about environment effects, and by neighbours regarding security. The extra traffic and additional development could cause a further decline of the threatened Red Sea dugong population and damage to coral reefs and fisheries. One such organization, Hurghada Environmental Protection and Conservation Association (HEPCA) approves a bridge subject to reefs not being harmed and an environmental survey with recommendations implemented. Article V of the Camp David Accords between Israel and Egypt provides for the right of freedom of navigation through the Strait of Tiran.

The project was suspended in 2005 by the Hosni Mubarak government, due to security concerns voiced by Israel. Before it lost power, the Mohamed Morsi administration was reported to be interested in finalizing plans for the project in 2012 and 2013.

In April 2016, on a rare visit to Egypt, King Salman of Saudi Arabia announced with Egypt's President El-Sisi an agreement to build a bridge between the two countries. The announcement followed Egypt and Saudi Arabia signing an agreement on maritime border demarcation and marking the islands of Tiran and Sanafir within Saudi regional waters. Israel announced that it does not object to the island transfer.

See also
The Line, Saudi Arabia
Transport in Saudi Arabia
Transport in Egypt
Bridge of the Horns – on hold, projected cost about $10b 
NEOM, a planned city within Saudi Arabia

References

International bridges
Bridges in Egypt
Bridges in Saudi Arabia
Proposed bridges in Asia
Egypt–Saudi Arabia relations
Proposed transcontinental crossings